Carney may refer to:

 Carney (surname)

Places

In the United States
 Carney, Maryland
 Carney, Michigan
 Carney, Montana
 Carney, Oklahoma
 Carney, West Virginia
 Carney, Pennsylvania

In the Republic of Ireland
 Carney, County Sligo
 Carney, County Tipperary

Other uses
 Carney (Cross Canadian Ragweed album)
 Carney (Leon Russell album), 1972
 Carney Hospital, a hospital in New England
 USS Carney, US Navy ship

See also
 Kearney (disambiguation), alternative transliteration from Irish
 Carny (disambiguation)
 Justice Carney (disambiguation)